The J. C. Fox Building, located at 115 S. Main St. in Hailey, Idaho, is a historic building built in 1920.  It is listed on the National Register of Historic Places (NRHP).

The building was heated by water from Hailey Hot Springs piped about two miles.  The building held a saloon and the First National Bank of Bailey;  later it hosted a 10-room hospital on the second floor, so many Hailey residents were born above a saloon.  Dr. J. C. Fox served the community as doctor for 41 years.

The building is an example of Early Commercial style architecture.  It was listed on the National Register in 1983.

References

Commercial buildings on the National Register of Historic Places in Idaho
Buildings designated early commercial in the National Register of Historic Places
Commercial buildings completed in 1920
Buildings and structures in Blaine County, Idaho
National Register of Historic Places in Blaine County, Idaho